David C. Weiss (born 1956) is an American attorney. He currently serves as the United States Attorney for the United States District Court for the District of Delaware. Weiss started at the office in 2007, eventually rising to First Assistant United States Attorney, during which time he was interim U.S. Attorney from 2009 to 2011. He also served as an Assistant United States Attorney from 1986 to 1989, prosecuting violent crimes and white-collar offenses. In between his stints at the United States Attorney's Office, Weiss was a commercial litigation associate and partner at Duane Morris and an executive at a financial services firm. He clerked for Andrew D. Christie of the Delaware Supreme Court. 

On February 15, 2018, his nomination to be the United States Attorney was confirmed by voice vote. He was sworn in on February 22, 2018. Weiss has been in charge of the investigations into the financial dealings of Hunter Biden and was asked to stay on during the Biden administration.

References

External links
 Biography at the U.S. Attorney's Office

1956 births
21st-century American lawyers
Assistant United States Attorneys
Delaware lawyers
Lawyers from Philadelphia
Living people
United States Attorneys for the District of Delaware
Washington University in St. Louis alumni
Widener University School of Law alumni